USS Jasper (PYc-13) was a coastal patrol yacht in the service of the United States Navy. She was named for the gemstone Jasper.

The first Jasper (PYc-13), a diesel-powered yacht, was built as Stranger by Lake Union Dry Dock Co., Seattle, Washington, in 1938; purchased 1 July 1941, from her owner, Fred E. Lewis; renamed Jasper; and placed in service at San Diego, California, 8 July 1941.

World War II service 
After the installation of experimental sound and electronic equipment, Jasper was assigned to the 11th Naval District to perform research work at the Naval Sound Laboratory, San Diego. She continued this important scientific work throughout the war taking part in experiments with radio and sound waves in cooperation with the University of California, Division of War Research. Echo-ranging equipment on board Jasper was used in 1946, to discover a deep 300-mile-wide oceanic layer off the coast of California.

The ship was placed out of service 14 August 1947, at San Diego and turned over to the Maritime Commission for disposal in June 1948.

References

External links 
 Lake Union Dry Dock, Seattle Washington
 

Patrol vessels of the United States Navy
Patrol vessels of the United States
World War II patrol vessels of the United States
Ships built in Seattle
1938 ships
Ships built by the Lake Union Dry Dock Company